Slovenia has sent athletes to every edition of the quadrennial Mediterranean Games since the nation's first appearance at the 1993 Mediterranean Games following its independence from Yugoslavia. As of 2018, Slovenian athletes have won a total of 195 medals.

Overview

By event

See also
Slovenia at the Olympics
Slovenia at the Paralympics

External links
Medals table per country and per Games at the official International Committee of Mediterranean Games (CIJM) website